WXRL (1300 AM) is a commercial radio station in Lancaster, New York, serving the Buffalo metropolitan area.  It broadcasts a classic country radio format.  WXRL is owned and operated by the family of Ramblin' Lou Schriver, a well known local country music performer, under the name Dome Broadcasting Inc.  The radio studios and transmitter are on William Street in Lancaster.

By day, WXRL transmits with 5,000 watts, but to protect other stations on 1300 AM from interference, it reduces power at night to 2,500 watts.  It uses directional antenna with a four-tower array.  Programming is also heard on 250-watt FM translator W238DD at 95.5 MHz.

History
In , the station signed on as WMMJ. The station had been founded by Stan Jasinski, a local media personality known mostly for his polka broadcasts.  Polka has been a fixture of the station's format since its inception.  When Jasinski shifted his focus to television and started up Channel 29 WUTV in 1970, he sold the radio station to Ramblin' Lou Schriver, who owned the station for the rest of his life and installed what was then the first country music station in Western New York. 

When more modern FM country stations such as WYRK and WNUC started reaching the airwaves in the early 1990s, Schriver, like numerous other AM country stations, maintained a classic country format. Schriver died January 17, 2016, from heart failure at age 86. His family and heirs continue to own and operate the station.

As of October 23, 2018, after a long application process with the FCC, WXRL added an FM translator at 95.5 MHz. The station's format did not change with the addition of the new translator. In 2020, WXRL became the last commercial radio station in the Buffalo area to begin streaming its programming on the Internet.

Programs
Local hosts include Ron Dombrowski, Matty K and Lynn Carol Schriver. Scott Cleveland was a longtime on-air personality with the station until his death in 2015.  Ramblin' Lou Schriver's reruns of "The Old Country Church" continue to be posthumously broadcast on the station. The station has a "Drive Time Polkas" show from 5 till 7 pm Monday thru Saturday and also devotes a large portion of its weekend programming to polka music.

Syndicated programs include the Renfro Valley Gatherin', Classic Country Today with Keith Bilbrey and "Country Music Greats" with Jim Ed Brown. WXRL is an affiliate of CBS Radio News.

The station also airs some local sports programming, predominantly from Lancaster High School.

WXRL carries only a small amount of external advertising, with most of its commercial spots advertising appearances by the Ramblin' Lou Family Band and "Ramblin' Lou Tours" (bus trips sold and promoted by the Schriver family to locations mostly in the eastern United States).

References

External links
 Official WXRL Web site
 WXRL official Facebook page

XRL
Country radio stations in the United States
Radio stations established in 1965
1965 establishments in New York (state)